The 2003 Arlington mayoral election was held on May 3, 2003 to elect the mayor of Arlington, Texas. The election was officially nonpartisan. It saw the election of Robert Cluck.

If no candidate had obtained a majority of the vote, a runoff would have been held.

Results

References

Arlington mayoral
Arlington
2003
Non-partisan elections